= Joan Cochran Sommers =

American accordion player and conductor

Joan Cochran Sommers is an accordion player and conductor from Kansas City, Missouri. Cochran Sommers' first accordion was acquired from a door-to-door salesman. She founded the accordion program at the University of Missouri- Kansas City in 1961, where she taught until she retired in 2000. She was named an honorary member of the Confédération Internationale des Accordéonistes in 2014.
